Maha Bodhi Ta Htaung is a Buddhist religious complex located in Monywa Township, Sagaing Region, Myanmar (Burma). It is known for the Giant Standing Buddha statue, the third tallest in the world, and for the Great Attitudes of U Narãda, who built the monastery. This Sāsana (religious) site contains thousands of Buddha statues beneath thousands of Bo trees, the Giant Reclining Buddha Statue, Aung Sekkya Stupa, and other large Buddha statues. Currently, a Sitting Buddha Statue, which is expected to become the world's largest Sitting Buddha Statue, is in construction. Many Buddhist monks can study the Buddhist Pariyatti literature at the monastery. Moreover, meditation centres or Vipassãnā centres are opened at this monastic site both for monks and laypersons.

History
Maha Bodhi Ta Htaung was founded by Maha Bodhi Ta Htaung Sayadaw Ven Nārada on 5 May 1960. He planted thousands of Bo trees throughout his life on recalling the Buddha attained beneath the Bo tree in Bodh Gaya, India. He started to plant them on a  plot, with Nan Oo Sayadaw, the grandson of King Mindon, at 8.55 AM on 6 May 1960. Bo trees hold religious significance for Buddhists since it is the tree under which Buddha attained enlightenment.

Before he reached this monastery, the monastery was just a small one for Khatakkan villagers. Now, the  Bodhi Ta Htaung (One Thousand Bo Trees) Auspicious Ground has been extended to a  area that has more than 9,000 Bo trees. The monastery is noted in Myanmar and around the world for its many thousands of Bodhi trees.

Laykyun Sekkya statue

The mural paintings in every floor for each Realm are very interesting and famous. It is the second-tallest Buddha statue in the world after the Spring Temple Buddha in China. Construction of the statue was finished in 2008. On Banda vah mountain in Bodhi Tahtaung monastery, a Sitting Buddha statue is also being built for completing the last desire of Sayadawgyi, U Nārada.

Reclining Buddha Statue

The Reclining Buddha Statue was built on 8 January 1991. It is hollow inside the statue and the Great Chronicles of Buddha are displayed.

Aung Sekkya Pagoda
Built in 1979, the Aung Sekkya was modeled after the Shwedagon pagoda in Yangon. At , the pagoda is about two thirds the size of the Shwedagon. People can walk up the outside stairs or walk through the hollow walkway inside the stupa in to the dome of the stupa.

Leadership
The site is led by a chief abbot known as a sayadaw. The founding abbot, Ven. Narada, died in Mandalay on 22 November 2006. Since his demise, five Chief sayadaws have succeeded him as the Nāyaka Sayadaws according to his will.

References

Buddhist temples in Myanmar
Religious buildings and structures completed in 1960